Lebanon (LIB) competed at the 2005 Mediterranean Games in Almería, Spain. The nation had a total number of 20 participants (16 men and 4 women).

See also
 Lebanon at the 2004 Summer Olympics
 Lebanon at the 2008 Summer Olympics

References
 Official Site

Nations at the 2005 Mediterranean Games
2005
Mediterranean Games